The Basque Pelota competition at the 2014 Central American and Caribbean Games was held in Veracruz, Mexico.

The tournament was scheduled to be held from 18–23 November at the Basque Pelota Pavilion.

Medal summary

Men's events

Women's events

Medal table

References

External links
Official Website

2014 Central American and Caribbean Games events
Central American and Caribbean Games
2014 in basque pelota
Basque pelota competitions in Mexico